Sabine Klewe pseudonym: Sabine Martin (born 1 February 1966 in Düsseldorf) is a German writer, who published mainly crime novels.

Life and work 
Sabine Klewe, born 1966 in Düsseldorf, studied literature in Düsseldorf and London. Besides her work as an author she is also a freelance literary translator and lecturer at the Heinrich-Heine-Universität Düsseldorf.

In November 2006 she received for her short story "Marilyn" the Carinthian Thriller Prize (3rd place) and in December 2006 the Förderpreis für Literatur der Landeshauptstadt Düsseldorf in Northrhine-Westphalia

Since 2004, she has published five thrillers about the hobby investigator Katrin Sandmann. Together with the author Martin Conrath she has released four historical crime novels. In April 2013 appeared to her so far 12th novel: Die weißen Schatten der Nacht is the second case for the Düsseldorf investigators duo Lydia Louis and Christopher Solomon.

Sabine Klewe is a member of the Köln-Düsseldorfer Kriminalkomitee. She is the mother of three sons and lives in Bilk.

Awards 
 2006: Förderpreis für Literatur der Landeshauptstadt Düsseldorf
 2006: Kärntner Krimipreis (3rd place)
 2013: Arbeitsstipendium der Landeshauptstadt Düsseldorf

Publications

Katrin Sandman series 
 2004: Schattenriss
 2005: Kinderspiel
 2006: Wintermärchen
 2008: Blutsonne
 2013: Schwanenlied

Lydia Louis and Christopher Solomon series 
 2012: Der Seele weißes Blut
 2013: Die weißen Schatten der Nacht

Historical novels 
 2007: Das Geheimnis der Madonna (along with Martin Conrath)
 2008: Das Vermächtnis der Schreiberin (along with Martin Conrath)
 2009: Die schwarzseidene Dame
 2012: Die Henkerin (under the pseudonym Sabine Martin with Martin Conrath)
 2013: Die Tränen der Henkerin (under the pseudonym Sabine Martin with Martin Conrath)

Liz Montario and Georg Stadler series 
 2013: Schwesterlein, komm stirb mit mir (as Karen Sander)
 2014: Wer nicht hören will, muss sterben (as Karen Sander)
 2015: Ich sehe was, und das ist tot (as Karen Sander)

External links 
 
 Website by Sabine Klewe
 Portrait of Sabine Klewe in: Westdeutsche Zeitung
 Portrait of Sabine Klewe in: Randomhouse
 Sabine Klewe in: NRW Literatur im Netz

References 

1966 births
Living people
Writers from Düsseldorf
German women novelists
German crime writers
German detective fiction writers
German crime fiction writers
21st-century German novelists
Heinrich Heine University Düsseldorf alumni
21st-century German women writers
Women crime fiction writers